Recurvaria vestigata is a moth of the family Gelechiidae first described by Edward Meyrick in 1929. It is found in North America, where it has been recorded from Ontario.

The wingspan is about 13 mm. The forewings are white sprinkled with fuscous and with an oblique sometimes interrupted dark fuscous streak from the dorsum at one-fourth reaching halfway across the wing, a small spot on the costa beyond one-third, and a dot between these, forming a straight series. The stigmata are linear, black, the plical nearly beneath the first discal, a blackish dash reaching nearly from the first to the second discal but rather beneath them. There is a faint acutely angulated transverse whitish line at about three-fourths, preceded on the costa and dorsum by small spots of blackish suffusion, a short black dash within the angle of this. There is also a mark of blackish suffusion before the apex and a marginal series of small blackish marks around the posterior part of the costa and termen. The hindwings are pale grey, subhyaline (almost glass like) anteriorly. Adults are on wing from April to June.

References

Moths described in 1929
Recurvaria
Moths of North America